The Harzwasserwerke GmbH (English: Harz Water Works Limited) is a major German water company and dam operator based in Hildesheim, located within the German federal state of Lower Saxony.

Founded in 1928, the Harzwasserwerke were tasked with supplying drinking water, providing electrical power and flood protection. Over the course of the past 75 years, the Harzwasserwerke have expanded to be the biggest water supply company in Lower Saxony and is among the top ten water companies in Germany.

The company utilizes the nearby Harz mountains, a well-known nature reserve and tourist destination in Germany, as a source of high-quality drinking water. Water is impounded in six reservoirs built between 1930 and 1969 in the Lower Saxon part of the Harz mountains; drinking water is prepared in three waterworks and distributed through pipes to large parts of Lower Saxony. The system is supplemented by four groundwater waterworks on the North German plain.

Currently delivering over 94,4 million cubic meters of water per year, the Harzwasserwerke supply a number of municipal utilities as far away as Bremen, Brunswick, Wolfsburg and Hanover, among others. The elevation difference between the Harz mountains and the North German plain makes the terrain very suitable for the production of electrical energy by means of hydropower. Several dams are operated by the company and thus make it an important producer of renewable energy.

Having been founded as a publicly owned enterprise, the company was privatized in 1996. It is still performing a number of public and communal services that go beyond the portfolio of other water suppliers. Beside the management and administration of flood protection installations, perhaps most intriguingly, the company is also responsible for the maintenance of the Upper Harz Water Regale, which has been designated by the UNESCO as a World Heritage Site in 2010.

Harzwasserwerke GmbH is currently managed by Renke Droste and Guenter Wolters as CEOs. The annual turnover for 2010 surpassed 40 million EUR, while profits soared to 6.46 million EUR (up 36.5 percent from 2009).

See also 
 List of dams in the Harz
 Dams
 Drinking water

References

External links 
 Official website

Water companies of Germany
Water supply and sanitation in Germany
Economy of Hildesheim
Harz
Companies based in Lower Saxony